LibreELEC (short for Libre Embedded Linux Entertainment Center) is a non-profit fork of OpenELEC as an open source software appliance, a Linux-based Just enough operating system for the Kodi media player. This fork of OpenELEC announced in March 2016 as a split from the OpenELEC team after "creative differences", taking most of its active developers at the time to join the new LibreELEC project.
This is a conservative fork of the OpenELEC project with a stronger focus on pre-release testing and post-release change management.

History 

Because of the end of Python 2 support in 2020, LibreElec version 10 with Kodi 19 switches to Python 3. Therefore, addons created for prior versions with python 2 need to be updated by developers for Kodi 19 because python code is not backward compatible.

References

External links 

ARM operating systems
Embedded Linux distributions
Free media players
Linux distributions used in appliances
Linux-based devices
Linux distributions